Villeparisis is a commune in the Seine-et-Marne department in the Île-de-France region in north-central France. It is located in the north-eastern suburbs of Paris  from the centre.

Inhabitants of Villeparisis are called Villeparisiens.

Population

Transport
Villeparisis is served by Villeparisis–Mitry-le-Neuf station on Paris RER line B.

Twin towns – sister cities

Villeparisis is twinned with:
 Maldon, England, United Kingdom
 Pietrasanta, Italy
 Wathlingen, Germany

Notable people
Henri Cleutin (1515–1566), diplomat

See also
Communes of the Seine-et-Marne department

References

External links

Official website 

Communes of Seine-et-Marne